Adams Township is a township in Harrison County, Missouri.

References

Townships in Harrison County, Missouri
Townships in Missouri